Crescent View station is a light rail station in Sandy, Utah, United States, served by the Blue Line of Utah Transit Authority's TRAX light rail system. The Blue Line provides service from Downtown Salt Lake City to Draper.

Description
The station is located in the southern end of Sandy at 361 East 11400 South and is accessed on that road from either I-15 on the west (via the I-15/11400 South interchange) or 700 East (SR-71) on the east. The station is located within a residential area of the city, with no commercial development nearby. Immediately east of the station is the Porter Rockwell Trail (Sandy Railtrail). 

The station has a free Park and Ride lot. A unique feature of the station is signage that shows currently available parking spaces in the Park and Ride lot at this station, as well as at the two stations further south (Kimballs Lane and Draper Town Center). 

The station opened August 18, 2013, as part of the Draper extension of the Blue Line and is operated by Utah Transit Authority.

References

TRAX (light rail) stations
Railway stations in the United States opened in 2013
Railway stations in Salt Lake County, Utah
2013 establishments in Utah